Creatures of Orrorsh is a supplement published by West End Games in 1992 for the multi-genre role-playing game Torg.

Contents
In the game Torg, transdimensional aliens have taken over Earth, and have transformed various areas into alternate realities called "cosms" that allow the gamemaster to move the players from genre to genre. The cosm of Orrorsh is a horror genre. 

Creatures of Orrorsh is a book written by Bill Smith and Ed Stark that details sixty gruesome creatures that can be used by the gamemaster. Each creature is described in a two-page spread that includes an illustration, a map of where the creature lurks, and game statistics.

Reception
In the October 1992 edition of Dragon (#186), Rick Swan gave the book a thumbs up, and described it as "beasts, creeps and freaks that comprise the most stomach-turning menagerie this side of a splatter-film festival... all of it nicely done." Swan also noted that "The book's authors are the winners of a contest sponsored by West End's Infiniverse newsletter that challenged the readers to come up with 'the most loathsome, hideous, evil, repulsive, repugnant, horrifying, and disgusting creatures ever created for a role-playing game.' Mission accomplished."

Reviews
White Wolf Magazine (Issue 33 - Sep 1992)

References

Role-playing game supplements introduced in 1992
Torg supplements